Wisden Cricketers' Almanack Australia (also known as Wisden Australia) was a cricket annual and reference book, the Australian version of  Wisden Cricketers' Almanack, generally known as Wisden. The Australian edition's gestation period was lengthy: the first edition appeared in 1998, when the Preface referred to a March 1981 report in The Australian announcing the imminent appearance of the Australian edition.

Wisden Australia was published by Hardie Grant Publishing of Melbourne, at or near the beginning of the Australian season, in November or early December.  In contrast to the yellow cover of the parent publication Wisden Cricketers' Almanack, its cover was predominantly bright green. The last two editions published, those of 2004-05 and 2005–06, emulated the parent by featuring dustjackets with photographs.

The Australian edition was also somewhat slimmer and cheaper, as there were fewer games to report on in Australia; in most other respects the format and content of the Australian edition were similar to those of the English version. One difference was that the former's coverage of first grade cricket in each state and territory was more comprehensive than the latter's relatively sketchy  coverage of top level English club and league cricket.

The first two editions, dated 1998 and 1999, covered the 1997–98 and 1998-99 Australian seasons respectively. The numbering changed with the third edition, which adopted the practice of the English almanack by including in its title the date of the season immediately after the season covered. Thus the 2000-01 edition covered the 1999-2000 season, and so on up to the 2005-06 edition, the eighth in the series, published in 2005 which covered the domestic season 2004-05 and the 2005 Ashes tour in England.

No further edition has been published since 2005. The most comprehensive reviews and records of Australian cricket are now to be found online or in the reports of the various state cricket associations. The website of Cricket Australia, the national body, does not cover grade cricket in any detail.

See also
Wisden Australia's Cricketer of the Year

Cricket books
Almanacs
Wisden
1998 establishments in Australia
Publications established in 1998